The 1989 Ugandan Super League was the 22nd season of the official Ugandan football championship, the top-level football league of Uganda.

Overview
The 1989 Uganda Super League was contested by 12 teams and was won by SC Villa, while Mbale Heroes were relegated.

League standings

Leading goalscorer
The top goalscorer in the 1989 season was Majid Musisi of SC Villa with 15 goals.

References

External links
Uganda - List of Champions - RSSSF (Hans Schöggl)
Ugandan Football League Tables - League321.com

Ugandan Super League seasons
Uganda
Uganda
1